Raul Marian Opruț (born 4 January 1998) is a Romanian professional footballer who plays as a defender for Liga I club FC Hermannstadt.

Club career
He made his Serie C debut for Albissola on 19 September 2018 in a game against Olbia.

On 12 July 2019, Hermannstadt announced the signing of Opruț.

Career statistics

Club

International

References

External links
 

1998 births
People from Caransebeș
Living people
Romanian footballers
Association football defenders
Romania youth international footballers
Romania under-21 international footballers
Romania international footballers
Genoa C.F.C. players
Albissola 2010 players
Serie C players
Liga I players
Liga II players
FC Hermannstadt players
Romanian expatriate footballers
Romanian expatriate sportspeople in Italy
Expatriate footballers in Italy